The 2022 Gambian coup d'état attempt was a military coup d'état attempt which took place in The Gambia on 20 December 2022. Reportedly, some soldiers attempted to overthrow the government of President Adama Barrow. Four soldiers were arrested on suspicion of involvement. The Gambian military initially denied that any such coup attempt took place. It also went after three other alleged conspirators. The coup leader was later named as LCpl Sanna Fadera. The attempt was condemned by Economic Community of West African States (ECOWAS) and the main opposition party, the UDP.

UDP leader Momodou Sabally, who had served as the minister of presidential affairs under Yahya Jammeh, had suggested in a video released before the coup that Barrow would be overthrown before the 2023 Gambian local elections. He was arrested after the government foiled the plot, but was later released unconditionally. On 3 January 2023 the government charged two civilians and a sub-inspector of The Gambia Police Force for taking part in the plot. Eight soldiers were later charged on 6 January.

References

See also 
 2014 Gambian coup d'état attempt

2022 in the Gambia
2020s coups d'état and coup attempts
Attempted coups d'état in the Gambia
Conflicts in 2022
December 2022 events in Africa
Politics of the Gambia